Piceance Creek is a  tributary of the White River in Garfield and Rio Blanco counties in Colorado, United States. The name likely derives from the Shoshoni word /piasonittsi/ meaning “tall grass” (/pia-/ ‘big’ and /soni-/ ‘grass’).

See also

 List of rivers of Colorado
 List of tributaries of the Colorado River

References

External links

Rivers of Colorado
Rivers of Garfield County, Colorado
Rivers of Rio Blanco County, Colorado
Tributaries of the Green River (Colorado River tributary)
Tributaries of the Colorado River in Colorado